The Topaze-class cruisers (often referred to as the Gem-class) were a quartet of third-class protected cruisers built for the Royal Navy in the first decade of the 20th century (four additional ships of the class were cancelled before their keels were laid). HMS Amethyst of this class was the first warship larger than a destroyer to be powered by turbine engines.

As well as a significant historical 'first' this class also embodied many 'lasts' and, despite being units of the Edwardian-period Royal Navy, represented the end of the Victorian-period lineage of protected cruisers in many ways. Amongst the many cruiser classes of the Royal Navy to have been rated as protected cruisers these were; the last to be officially classified as such until the turbine-propelled Bristol class of 1909 appeared; the last to feature the traditional arrangement of raised forecastle & poop connected by amidships bulwarks; and, in the case of three out of the four ships, the last to be designed for propulsion by reciprocating steam engines.

Perhaps most significantly of all, the 'Gems' were the very last third-class cruisers to be so rated in the Royal Navy: the following classes of scout cruisers which featured internal protective decks instead of armour belts were of similar type, but were faster & weaker and intended for a very specialist role; they were accordingly assigned their new official type designation. When the later small turbine-propelled cruisers of the Arethusa class appeared (combining the features of scouts & second-class cruisers, to provide for greater utility & fighting power more in line with the Third Class), the new ships were designated from the outset as 'light armoured cruisers, thus dispensing with the third-class rating entirely.

Design and description
Discussions had been ongoing for several years about a successor to the previous  before the Admiralty decided on a design in 1901 that was very much larger and faster than the older ships. This represented a shift away from the traditional role of the third-class cruiser: previously best-suited to Imperial defence duties on foreign stations, but now shifting closer to the German concept of a light cruiser; a fast & potent small combatant, suitable for use with the Fleet for scouting duties in the presence of an enemy fleet. In this regard, the Topaze class demonstrates the effect of heightening tensions between the British and Germans, as the Royal Navy's procurement programmes began to emphasise potential combat in the North Sea in anticipation of a possible future war.

They displaced  and their crew consisted of 313 officers and other ranks.

One objective for the Admiralty with these ships was to evaluate steam turbines against traditional triple-expansion steam engines in a ship larger than a destroyer and  became the first cruiser to be equipped with them. Her three sisters used a pair of 4-cylinder triple-expansion steam engines, each driving one shaft, using steam provided by 10 water-tube boilers. The three ships easily exceeded their designed power and speeds during their sea trials.

Amethyst was fitted with a Parsons steam turbine set that drove three shafts using the same number of boilers as her sisters.

The main armament of the Topaze class consisted of a dozen quick-firing (QF)  guns. One gun each was mounted on the forecastle and the poop. The remaining ten guns were placed port and starboard amidships, with the forward and aftermost pairs of waist guns being sponsoned and the sides of the forecastle and poop embrasured to allow for axial fire from these four guns. This gave the ships a broadside of seven guns, with at least two guns able to fire through the extreme bow and quarter arcs, or three guns firing dead ahead and dead astern in a chase. The ships also carried eight QF 3-pounder Hotchkiss guns and two above water 18-inch (450 mm) torpedo tubes.

Ships

References

Bibliography

External links

 The Topaze or "Gem" class at battleshipscruisers.co.uk

Cruiser classes
Ship classes of the Royal Navy